Kongtoranee Payakaroon (born July 12, 1960 in Chachoengsao) is a retired Thai Muay Thai fighter and professional boxer. Payakaroon is the older brother of WBC and Lumpinee world champion Samart Payakroon.

Muay Thai career
Payakaroon (nickname: Chart; ชาติ) started his career from Muay Thai at the age of 11 before the brother, Samart. The brothers have the same trainer was Yodtong "Kru Tui" Senanan. Later, he became famous in the Amphoe Bang Lamung, eastern Thailand. In 1977, when he was 17 he came to Bangkok for as fighter under the famous promoter, Songchai Rattanasuban along with Samart, and since then, he has become a famous and favorite Muay Thai fighter. Before that, he had experienced about 100 fights. He  fought  with many famous fighters, such as Bangkhlanoi Sor.Thanikul, Samransak Muangsurin, Chamuakpetch Hapalang, Wangchannoi Sor Palangchai or Petdam Lookborai. His maximum remuneration was 120,000 baht in fight against Samingnoom Sithiboonthum at Rajadamnern Stadium. He won five different weight championships of the Lumpinee Stadium during 1978–84.

Professional career
Payakaroon debut on April 2, 1985 by defeating fellow-countryman Payao Poontarat, a former WBC Super flyweight champion. He made a total of nine wins before challenge Gilberto Román, WBC Super flyweight holder on December 19, 1986 at Indoor Stadium Huamark in the event organized by Gen Sunthorn Kongsompong. He was unanimously defeated with a very traumatized face.

He continued to fight three more times until he was ranked #1 of WBA Junior bantamweight. On January 28, 1988 he challenge with fellow Thai Khaosai Galaxy, a title holder at Lumpinee Stadium. In fact, he was well acquainted with Galaxy, because he was a sparring partner before.

In the battle, Payakaroon wore blue trunks with golden stripe and golden boots, used hit-and-run tactics through 12 round and although he was able knock down Galaxy in the fifth round. After the bout, he shouted confidently that he would definitely win including his fans and his manager too. But when the results are announced he was defeated. His manager, Songchai Rattanasuban churned out anger and shouted this fight were cheated.

He was later contacted by Ratanasuban to challenge for IBF Junior bantamweight championship with Indonesian title holder Ellyas Pical (former rival of Galaxy who had lost by knockout in the 14th round to Galaxy in 1987) at Pical's native, he declined because he expected to be paid less than he should have.

Retirement
After failing to challenge the world championship twice, Payakaroon returned to Mauy Thai again until retired in 1990, after retirement he went on to become a Muay Thai trainer in Japan for two years.

Later, he was an assistant trainer for Yodtong's Muay Thai gym (Sityodtong Gym, Bangkok). In addition, he also went to train Muay Thai in Baku, Azerbaijan as well.

Currently, he was the transfer of Muay Thai gym from his brother, Samart Payakaroon after Samart divorced his wife.

Titles and accomplishments

Muay Thai
Lumpinee Stadium
 1978 Lumpinee Stadium 102 lbs Champion
 1980 Lumpinee Stadium 108 lbs Champion
 1980 Lumpinee Stadium 112 lbs Champion
 1983 Lumpinee Stadium 115 lbs Champion
 1984 Lumpinee Stadium 118 lbs Champion

World Muay Thai Council
 1990 WMTC World 140 lbs Champion

Awards
 1978 King's Fighter of the Year
 1984 Sports Writers Association of Thailand Fighter of the Year

Fight record

Professional boxing record

Muay Thai record

|-  bgcolor="#cfc"
| 1993-04-24 || Win||align=left| Hiroshi Oshiba || MAJKF || Tokyo, Japan || KO (Left Hook)|| 1 ||
|-  bgcolor="#cfc"
| 1990-12-02 || Win||align=left| Dida Diafat ||  || England || Decision || 5 || 3:00 
|-
! style=background:white colspan=9 |
|-  style="background:#cfc;"
| 1990-11-01|| Win||align=left| Samransak Muangsurin || Lumpinee Stadium || Bangkok, Thailand || Decision || 5 || 3:00
|-  style="background:#c5d2ea;"
| 1990-10-12|| Draw||align=left| Samransak Muangsurin || Lumpinee Stadium || Bangkok, Thailand || Decision || 5 || 3:00
|-  style="background:#cfc;"
| 1990-09-01 || Win ||align=left| Sakmongkol Sithchuchok || Lumpinee Stadium || Bangkok, Thailand || KO (Right Hook)||  3||
|-  bgcolor="#cfc"
| 1990- || Win||align=left| John Fortes ||  || Netherlands || TKO (Punches)|| 1 ||
|-  style="background:#fbb;"
| 1989-06-23 ||Loss||align=left| Samranthong Kiatbanchong || Lumpinee Stadium || Bangkok, Thailand || Decision  || 5 || 3:00
|-  bgcolor="#cfc"
| 1990-05-27 || Win||align=left| Gilbert Ballantine ||  || Paris, France || Decision || 5 || 3:00
|-  style="background:#cfc;"
| 1990-05-15|| Win ||align=left| Samingnoi Kiatkamchai || Lumpinee Stadium || Bangkok, Thailand || Decision || 5 || 3:00
|-  style="background:#fbb;"
| 1990-04-24|| Loss||align=left| Kaonar Sor.Kettalingchan || Lumpinee Stadium || Bangkok, Thailand || Decision || 5 || 3:00
|-  style="background:#fbb;"
| 1989-03-28 || Loss||align=left| Pon Narupai || Lumpinee Stadium || Bangkok, Thailand || KO  || 3 ||
|-  style="background:#cfc;"
| 1989-02-24 || Win ||align=left| Grandprixnoi Muangchaiyaphum || Lumpinee Stadium || Bangkok, Thailand || KO (High Kick)|| 3 ||
|-  style="background:#fbb;"
| 1989-01-31 ||Loss||align=left| Wangchannoi Sor Palangchai || Lumpinee Stadium || Bangkok, Thailand || Decision  || 5 || 3:00
|-  style="background:#fbb;"
| 1988-12-02 || Loss ||align=left| Petchdam Lukborai || Lumpinee Stadium || Bangkok, Thailand || Decision || 5 || 3:00
|-  style="background:#cfc;"
| 1988-09-27 || Win ||align=left| Dokmaipa Por Pongsawang || Lumpinee Stadium || Bangkok, Thailand || Decision || 5 || 3:00
|-  style="background:#fbb;"
| 1988-08-05 || Loss ||align=left| Namphon Nongkee Pahuyuth || Lumpinee Stadium || Bangkok, Thailand || Decision || 5 || 3:00
|-  style="background:#fbb;"
| 1988-06-24 || Loss ||align=left| Panomtuanlek Hapalang || Lumpinee Stadium || Bangkok, Thailand || Decision || 5 || 3:00
|-  style="background:#cfc;"
| 1984-12-07|| Win ||align=left| Maewnoi Sitchang || Lumpinee Stadium || Bangkok, Thailand || Decision || 5 || 3:00
|-  style="background:#cfc;"
| 1984-11-09|| Win ||align=left| Petchdam Lukborai|| Lumpinee Stadium || Bangkok, Thailand || Decision || 5 || 3:00

|-  bgcolor="#cfc"
| 1984-09-21 || Win||align=left| Milo El Geubli ||  || France || Decision || 5 || 3:00
|-  style="background:#fbb;"
| 1984-09-14|| Loss ||align=left| Petchdam Lukborai || Lumpinee Stadium || Bangkok, Thailand || Decision || 5 || 3:00 
|-
! style=background:white colspan=9 |
|-  style="background:#cfc;"
| 1984-07-31|| Win ||align=left| Samransak Muangsurin || Lumpinee Stadium || Bangkok, Thailand || Decision || 5 || 3:00

|-  style="background:#fbb;"
| 1984-04-10|| Loss ||align=left| Manasak Sor Ploenchit || Lumpinee Stadium || Bangkok, Thailand || Decision || 5 || 3:00

|-  style="background:#cfc;"
| 1984-01-31|| Win ||align=left| Chamuekpet Hapalang || Lumpinee Stadium || Bangkok, Thailand || Decision || 5 || 3:00 
|-
! style=background:white colspan=9 |

|-  style="background:#cfc;"
| 1983-12-28|| Win ||align=left| Bangkhlanoi Sor.Thanikul || Rajadamnern Stadium || Bangkok, Thailand || Decision || 5||3:00
|-  style="background:#cfc;"
| 1983-11-15|| Win ||align=left| Samransak Muangsurin || Lumpinee Stadium || Bangkok, Thailand || Decision || 5 || 3:00
|-  style="background:#cfc;"
| 1983-10-13|| Win ||align=left| Bangkhlanoi Sor.Thanikul || Rajadamnern Stadium || Bangkok, Thailand || Decision || 5||3:00
|-  style="background:#cfc;"
| 1983-09-13|| Win||align=left| Phadam Lukbangbor || Lumpinee Stadium || Bangkok, Thailand || Decision|| 5 || 3:00
|-  style="background:#cfc;"
| 1983-08-26|| Win ||align=left| Rung Sakprasong || Lumpinee Stadium || Bangkok, Thailand || Decision || 5 || 3:00 
|-
! style=background:white colspan=9 |
|-  style="background:#cfc;"
| 1983-07-12|| Win ||align=left|  Phadam Lukbangbor || Lumpinee Stadium || Bangkok, Thailand || Decision || 5 || 3:00

|-  style="background:#cfc;"
| 1983-05-10|| Win ||align=left| Palanoi Kiatanan || Lumpinee Stadium || Bangkok, Thailand || KO || 4 ||
|-  style="background:#cfc;"
| 1983-04-05|| Win ||align=left| Pornsaknoi Sitchang || Lumpinee Stadium || Bangkok, Thailand || Decision || 5 || 3:00  
|-
! style=background:white colspan=9 |

|-  style="background:#cfc;"
| 1983-03-04|| Win ||align=left| Lankrung Kiatkriangkrai || Lumpinee Stadium || Bangkok, Thailand || Decision || 5 || 3:00
|-  style="background:#cfc;"
| 1983-01-28|| Win ||align=left| Pornsaknoi Sitchang || Lumpinee Stadium || Bangkok, Thailand || Decision || 5 || 3:00

|-  style="background:#fbb;"
| 1982-11-22|| Loss||align=left| Boonam Sor.Jarunee || Rajadamnern Stadium || Bangkok, Thailand || Decision || 5 || 3:00

|-  style="background:#fbb;"
| 1982-10-15|| Loss||align=left| Rung Sakprasong || Lumpinee Stadium || Bangkok, Thailand || Decision || 5 || 3:00
|-  style="background:#cfc;"
| 1982-08-24|| Win||align=left| Witsanaporn Saksamut|| Lumpinee Stadium || Bangkok, Thailand || Decision || 5 || 3:00

|-  style="background:#fbb;"
| 1982-06-22|| Loss||align=left| Chamuekpet Hapalang || Lumpinee Stadium || Bangkok, Thailand || Decision || 5 || 3:00 
|-
! style=background:white colspan=9 |
|-  style="background:#cfc;"
| 1982-05-10|| Win ||align=left| Phadam Lukbangbor || Lumpinee Stadium || Bangkok, Thailand || Referee Stoppage || 5 ||
|-  style="background:#cfc;"
| 1982-03-12|| Win ||align=left| Chamuekpet Hapalang || Lumpinee Stadium || Bangkok, Thailand || Decision || 5 || 3:00 
|-
! style=background:white colspan=9 |
|-  style="background:#fbb;"
| 1982-01-15|| Loss ||align=left| Bangkhlanoi Sor.Thanikul || Lumpinee Stadium || Bangkok, Thailand || Decision || 5 || 3:00
|-  style="background:#c5d2ea;"
| 1981-12-08|| Draw||align=left| Phanmongkol Hor.Mahachai || Lumpinee Stadium || Bangkok, Thailand || Decision || 5 || 3:00
|-  style="background:#cfc;"
| 1981-11-09|| Win||align=left| Fahkamram Sitponthep || Rajadamnern Stadium || Bangkok, Thailand || Decision || 5 || 3:00
|-  style="background:#c5d2ea;"
| 1981-10-13|| Draw||align=left| Samransak Muangsurin || Rajadamnern Stadium || Bangkok, Thailand || Decision || 5 || 3:00
|-  style="background:#fbb;"
| 1981-09-21|| Loss||align=left| Samransak Muangsurin || Rajadamnern Stadium || Bangkok, Thailand || Decision || 5 || 3:00
|-  style="background:#cfc;"
| 1981-09-04|| Win||align=left| Fahkamram Sitponthep || Lumpinee Stadium || Bangkok, Thailand || Decision || 5 || 3:00 
|-
! style=background:white colspan=9 |
|-  style="background:#fbb;"
| 1981-07-14|| Loss||align=left| Mafuang Weerapol || Lumpinee Stadium || Bangkok, Thailand || Decision || 5 || 3:00
|-  style="background:#cfc;"
| 1981-06-09|| Win||align=left| Jakrawal Kiatisaktewai|| Rajadamnern Stadium || Bangkok, Thailand || Decision || 5 || 3:00
|-  style="background:#cfc;"
| 1981-05-13|| Win||align=left| Samingnoom Sithiboontham || Rajadamnern Stadium || Bangkok, Thailand || Decision || 5 || 3:00
|-  style="background:#cfc;"
| 1981-04-20|| Win||align=left| Somsaknoi Kiatyothin || Lumpinee Stadium || Bangkok, Thailand || Decision || 5 || 3:00
|-  style="background:#cfc;"
| 1981-03-31|| Win ||align=left| Man Sor.Jitpattana|| Lumpinee Stadium || Bangkok, Thailand || KO || 5 ||
|-  style="background:#cfc;"
| 1981-01-23|| Win ||align=left| Piyarat Sor.Narongmit || Lumpinee Stadium || Bangkok, Thailand || Referee Stoppage || 5 ||
|-  style="background:#fbb;"
| 1980-12-02|| Loss||align=left| Mafuang Weerapol || Onesongchai, Lumpinee Stadium || Bangkok, Thailand || Decision (Unanimous) || 5 || 3:00
|-
! style=background:white colspan=9 |
|-  style="background:#cfc;"
| 1980-11-07|| Win ||align=left| Phanomongkol Hor.Mahachai || Lumpinee Stadium || Bangkok, Thailand || Decision || 5 || 3:00
|-  style="background:#cfc;"
| 1980-09-23|| Win||align=left| Singtong Prasopchai || Lumpinee Stadium || Bangkok, Thailand || Decision || 5 ||3:00 
|-
! style=background:white colspan=9 |
|-  style="background:#cfc;"
| 1980-08-29|| Win ||align=left| Denpayak Sakwitthaya || Lumpinee Stadium || Bangkok, Thailand || Decision || 5 || 3:00
|-  style="background:#cfc;"
| 1980-07-29|| Win ||align=left| Fonluang Looksadetmaepuangtong || Lumpinee Stadium || Bangkok, Thailand || Decision || 5 || 3:00 
|-
! style=background:white colspan=9 |
|-  style="background:#cfc;"
| 1980-06-06|| Win ||align=left| Bangkhlanoi Sor.Thanikul || Lumpinee Stadium || Bangkok, Thailand || Decision || 5 || 3:00 
|-
! style=background:white colspan=9 |
|-  style="background:#fbb;"
| 1980-03-31|| Loss ||align=left| Samoenai Kiatsongkram || Rajadamnern Stadium || Bangkok, Thailand || Decision || 5 || 3:00
|-  style="background:#cfc;"
| 1980-02-22|| Win ||align=left| Khiopit Chuwattana || Lumpinee Stadium || Bangkok, Thailand || Decision || 5 || 3:00 
|-
! style=background:white colspan=9 |
|-  style="background:#fbb;"
| 1980-01-29|| Loss||align=left| Hanuman Sitporluang || Lumpinee Stadium || Bangkok, Thailand || Decision || 5 || 3:00
|-  style="background:#fbb;"
| 1979-11-02|| Loss ||align=left| Khunponoi Sitprasang || Lumpinee Stadium || Bangkok, Thailand || Decision || 5 || 3:00
|-
! style=background:white colspan=9 |
|-  style="background:#cfc;"
| 1978-10-10|| Win ||align=left| Yodphol Pongsing|| Lumpinee Stadium || Bangkok, Thailand || Decision || 5 || 3:00
|-  style="background:#c5d2ea;"
| 1979-10-02|| Draw||align=left| Bangkhlanoi Sor.Thanikul|| Lumpinee Stadium || Bangkok, Thailand || Decision || 5 || 3:00 
|-
! style=background:white colspan=9 |
|-  style="background:#;"
| 1979-09-04||  ||align=left| Hanuman Sitporluang || Lumpinee Stadium || Bangkok, Thailand || ||  ||
|-  style="background:#cfc;"
| 1979-08-17|| Win ||align=left| Kingchai Phisanchai || Lumpinee Stadium || Bangkok, Thailand || Decision || 5 || 3:00
|-  style="background:#fbb;"
| 1979-06-26|| Loss ||align=left| Bangkhlanoi Sor.Thanikul || Lumpinee Stadium || Bangkok, Thailand || Decision || 5 || 3:00 
|-
! style=background:white colspan=9 |
|-  style="background:#cfc;"
| 1979-04-20||  WIn ||align=left| Somsaknoi Kiatyothin || Lumpinee Stadium || Bangkok, Thailand || Decision || 5 || 3:00
|-  style="background:#cfc;"
| 1979-03-23|| Win ||align=left| Kingchai Phisanchai || Lumpinee Stadium || Bangkok, Thailand || Decision || 5 || 3:00 
|-
! style=background:white colspan=9 |
|-  style="background:#fbb;"
| 1979-01-09|| Loss||align=left| Kingchai Lookbangbo || Lumpinee Stadium || Bangkok, Thailand || Decision || 5 || 3:00
|-  style="background:#cfc;"
| 1978-12-15|| Win ||align=left| Hanuman Sitporluang || Lumpinee Stadium || Bangkok, Thailand || Decision || 5 || 3:00 
|-
! style=background:white colspan=9 |
|-  style="background:#cfc;"
| 1978-10-27|| Win ||align=left| Bangkhlanoi Sor.Thanikul || Lumpinee Stadium || Bangkok, Thailand || Decision || 5 || 3:00
|-  style="background:#cfc;"
| 1978-10-10|| Win ||align=left| Yodphol Pongsing|| Lumpinee Stadium || Bangkok, Thailand || Decision || 5 || 3:00
|-  style="background:#cfc;"
| 1978-09-22|| Win ||align=left| Jockylek Singsayan|| Lumpinee Stadium || Bangkok, Thailand || Decision || 5 || 3:00
|-  style="background:#cfc;"
| 1978-06-13|| Win ||align=left| Jockynoi Singsayan|| Lumpinee Stadium || Bangkok, Thailand || Decision || 5 || 3:00
|-  style="background:#cfc;"
| 1978-05-23|| Win ||align=left| Rungsakorn Asiabaeber|| Lumpinee Stadium || Bangkok, Thailand || Decision || 5 || 3:00
|-
| colspan=9 | Legend:

See also
List of boxing families

References

External links
 

1960 births
Living people
Kongtoranee Payakaroon
Kongtoranee Payakaroon
Kongtoranee Payakaroon
Flyweight kickboxers
Bantamweight kickboxers
Kongtoranee Payakaroon
Super-flyweight boxers
Thai expatriate sportspeople in Japan